The men's 100 metres event at the 2008 African Championships in Athletics was held at the Addis Ababa Stadium on April 30–May 1.

Medalists

Results

Heats
Qualification: First 3 of each heat (Q) and the next 6 fastest (q) qualified for the semifinals.

Wind: Heat 1: -3.9 m/s, Heat 2: -1.2 m/s, Heat 3: -1.4 m/s, Heat 4: -0.5 m/s, Heat 5: -0.5 m/s, Heat 6: -0.4 m/s

Semifinals
Qualification: First 2 of each semifinal (Q) and the next 2 fastest (q) qualified for the final.

Wind: Heat 1: +0.4 m/s, Heat 2: +0.5 m/s, Heat 3: +0.5 m/s

Final
Wind: +1.2 m/s

References
Results (Archived)

2008 African Championships in Athletics
100 metres at the African Championships in Athletics